The 1988 Cleveland Indians season was the 88th season for the franchise. The team, managed by Doc Edwards, finished sixth in the American League East.

Despite its mediocre season, the team had a significant legacy in Major League Baseball in the 21st century.
 Bud Black, pitcher – San Diego Padres
 Terry Francona, first baseman/outfielder – Cleveland Indians
 John Farrell, pitcher – Boston Red Sox
 Charlie Manuel, hitting coach – Philadelphia Phillies
 Ron Washington, utility infielder – Texas Rangers

The team also had players who became MLB Broadcasters, coaches, and front office executives:

 Scott Bailes, pitcher- fill-in broadcaster for the Cleveland Indians
 Tom Candiotti, pitcher- radio color analyst for the Arizona Diamondbacks
 Rod Nichols, pitcher- former Philadelphia Phillies bullpen coach, current Iowa Cubs pitching coach
 Rick Rodriguez, pitcher- former Oakland Athletics bullpen coach, current Sacramento River Cats
 Greg Swindell, pitcher- former Arizona Diamondbacks pregame and postgame analyst. In 2011, Swindell served as the color commentator for the Little League Southwest Region tournament
 Chris Bando, catcher- former Milwaukee Brewers bench and 3rd base coach from 1996–1998
 Jay Bell, infielder- former Arizona Diamondbacks bench and hitting coach, former Pittsburgh Pirates hitting coach, former Cincinnati Reds bench coach
 Brook Jacoby, infielder- former Cincinnati Reds hitting coach and current Toronto Blue Jays hitting coach
 Willie Upshaw, infielder- former San Francisco Giants 1st base coach
 Joe Carter, outfielder- former Toronto Blue Jays and Chicago Cubs TV analyst
 Dave Clark, outfielder- former Pittsburgh Pirates hitting coach, former Houston Astros interim manager, 3rd base coach, and 1st base coach, and currently the Detroit Tigers third base coach
 Cory Snyder, outfielder- hitting coach for the Jackson Generals, a Double-A affiliate of the Seattle Mariners
 Pat Tabler, outfielder- Toronto Blue Jays TV color analyst
 Rod Allen, outfielder- former Arizona Diamondbacks broadcaster, current Detroit Tigers television analyst
 Dan Firova, catcher- current Washington Nationals bullpen coach
 Doug Jones, closer- current pitching coach of the Boise Hawks, the short-season A affiliate of the Colorado Rockies

Offseason
 January 15, 1988: Rick Rodriguez was signed as a free agent by the Indians.
 January 19, 1988: John Moses was signed as a free agent by the Indians.
 January 19, 1988: Greg Harris was signed as a free agent by the Indians.
 February 3, 1988: Doug Piatt was signed as an amateur free agent by the Indians.
 February 9, 1988: Dan Schatzeder was signed as a free agent by the Indians.
 February 22, 1988: Chris Codiroli was signed as a free agent by the Indians.
 February 28, 1988: Terry Francona was signed as a free agent by the Indians.
 March 17, 1988: Mark Huismann was released by the Indians.
 March 24, 1988: Greg Harris was released by the Indians.
 March 25, 1988: Willie Upshaw was purchased by the Indians from the Toronto Blue Jays.
 March 29, 1988: John Moses was released by the Indians.

Regular season

Season standings

Record vs. opponents

Notable transactions
 May 11, 1988: Dan Firova was signed as a free agent by the Indians.
 June 2, 1988: Houston Jiménez was signed as a free agent by the Indians.
 June 3, 1988: Pat Tabler was traded by the Indians to the Kansas City Royals for Bud Black.
 June 22, 1988: Dan Schatzeder was released by the Cleveland Indians.
 September 6, 1988: Chris Codiroli was released by the Indians.

Opening Day Lineup

Roster

Statistics

Batting
Note: G = Games played; AB = At bats; R = Runs scored; H = Hits; 2B = Doubles; 3B = Triples; HR = Home runs; RBI = Runs batted in; AVG = Batting average; SB = Stolen bases

Pitching
Note: W = Wins; L = Losses; ERA = Earned run average; G = Games pitched; GS = Games started; SV = Saves; IP = Innings pitched; R = Runs allowed; ER = Earned runs allowed; BB = Walks allowed; K = Strikeouts

Awards and honors

All-Star Game

Farm system 

LEAGUE CHAMPIONS: Kinston

References

1988 Cleveland Indians at Baseball Reference
1988 Cleveland Indians at Baseball Almanac

Cleveland Guardians seasons
Cleveland Indians season
Cleve